Cambuslang West is one of the 20 electoral wards of South Lanarkshire Council. Created in 2007, the ward elects three councillors using the single transferable vote electoral system and covers an area with a population of 17,418 people.

The ward was previously a Labour stronghold with the party holding at least two of the three seats between 2007 and 2017. However, it has since swung towards the Scottish National Party (SNP) with the party holding two of the three seats since 2017.

Boundaries
The ward was created following the Fourth Statutory Reviews of Electoral Arrangements ahead of the 2007 Scottish local elections. As a result of the Local Governance (Scotland) Act 2004, local elections in Scotland would use the single transferable vote electoral system from 2007 onwards so Cambuslang East was formed from an amalgamation of several previous first-past-the-post wards. It contained the majority of the former Cairns ward, roughly half of the former Cambuslang Central ward as well as all of the former Hallside ward. As a result of amendments to the boundaries of the South Lanarkshire Council's management areas, the boundaries between Rutherglen and Cambuslang, East Kilbride and Hamilton were tweaked so Cambuslang East also contained part of the former Long Calderwood ward.

Most new multi-member wards were formed from at least three smaller predecessors, but the population of Cambuslang in the area now represented by Cambuslang East had increased substantially over the dozen years following the local government reforms in the 1990s due to the construction of the new Drumsagard neighbourhood, with further developments planned for sites including Westfarm, Newton Farm and Gilbertfield – these projects were largely completed over the next decade, increasing the ward's population above that of its neighbours.

Cambuslang East covers a suburban area in the east of Cambuslang including the neighbourhoods of Halfway, Cairns, the Circuit, Drumsagard, Lightburn, Newton and Westburn. The ward's northern boundary is the division with Glasgow City Council which runs along the River Clyde and it's eastern boundary is the Rotten Calder.

Prior to the local government reforms in the 1990s, Cambuslang was within the Glasgow District under Strathclyde Regional Council. One of its single-member wards was Halfway which included much of the same area as the current Cambuslang East.

Following the Fifth Statutory Reviews of Electoral Arrangements ahead of the 2017 Scottish local elections, streets around streets between Greenlees Road and the Cathcart Circle Line railway tracks over Hamilton Road were transferred into Cambuslang West.

Councillors

Election results

2022 election

2017 election

2012 election

2008 by-election

2007 election

Notes

References

Wards of South Lanarkshire
Cambuslang